The 1993 Penn Quakers football team represented the University of Pennsylvania in the 1993 NCAA Division I-AA football season. Penn went undefeated and won the Ivy League championship. Penn averaged 20,313 fans per game.

Schedule

References

Penn
Penn Quakers football seasons
Ivy League football champion seasons
College football undefeated seasons
Penn Quakers football